ROAR Magazine was an independent publication that described itself as a “journal of the radical imagination.” Its stated aim was to “provide grassroots perspectives from the front-lines of the global struggle for real democracy.”

Founded as an activist blog in 2010, the project had since expanded into an online magazine and quarterly print journal. In its early years, ROAR was particularly known for its coverage and analysis of the political fallout of the global financial crisis and the social movements that emerged in its wake, with Naomi Klein calling it “a very exciting window into the global uprisings.” The journal covered a broad set of social, political and economic issues.

ROAR announced its closure in April 2022.

Prominent contributors

 Michael Albert
 Janet Biehl
 Aviva Chomsky
 George Ciccariello-Maher
 Colin Crouch
 John Curl
 Dilar Dirik
 Eirik Eiglad
 Silvia Federici
 Peter Gelderloos
 David Graeber
 Michael Hardt
 David Harvey
 John Holloway
 Srećko Horvat
 George Katsiaficas
 Maria Mies
 Antonio Negri
 Immanuel Ness
 Oscar Olivera
 Kristin Ross
 Beverly Silver
 Marina Sitrin
 Nick Srnicek
 Jonas Staal
 Wolfgang Streeck
 Opal Tometi
 Richard D. Wolff
 Raúl Zibechi

Political views

ROAR published a variety of left-leaning political perspectives. Its authors and editors have notably come out in support of social movements and democratic struggles like the Arab Spring, the European anti-austerity movement, Occupy Wall Street, the Gezi Park protests, the Free Fare Movement in Brazil, the Zapatistas of Mexico, the Rojava Revolution, the South African shack dwellers, Idle No More, Black Lives Matter, the No Border network, Nuit Debout and many others.

References

External links
 

English-language magazines
Online magazines
Magazines published in Amsterdam
Magazines established in 2010
Quarterly magazines published in the Netherlands
Political magazines published in the Netherlands
Independent magazines